The buff-collared nightjar or Ridgway's whip-poor-will (Antrostomus ridgwayi) is a species of nightjar in the family Caprimulgidae. It is found in Guatemala, Honduras, Mexico, Nicaragua, and the U.S. states of Arizona and New Mexico.

Taxonomy and systematics

The buff-collared nightjar has two subspecies, the nominate Antrostomus ridgwayi ridgwayi and A. r. troglodytes. For a time it was included in genus Caprimulgus but was later restored to its original genus.

Description

The head, upperparts, and tail are brownish gray with gray, cream, and rust markings. It has a bright cinnamon buff collar on the hindneck and a narrow buffy white band under the throat. The wings are brownish black with cinnamon buff bands. The breast is brownish gray and the belly tan with dark brown bars. The ends of the two outermost tail feathers have much white in the male and a small amount of buff in the female.

Distribution and habitat

The nominate subspecies of buff-collared nightjar breeds from southeastern Arizona and southwestern New Mexico south through central Mexico to Morelos; it migrates from that area in winter. It is a year round resident in western Mexico from southern Sonora to Chiapas. A. r. troglodytes is a year round resident of Guatemala, Honduras, and possibly Nicaragua. They inhabit a variety of landscapes including thickly vegetated ravines and canyons in the arid north and thorn scrub and moister pine-oak woodlands to the south.

Behavior
The buff-collared nightjar is most active at dawn and dusk but is also nocturnal. During the day it roosts on the ground under low vegetation, typically on steep ground with its head pointing downhill.

Feeding

It hunts from dusk well into the night and again near dawn. Its diet of nocturnal flying insects has not been detailed.

Breeding

The buff-collared nightjar's breeding season has not been fully defined but includes at least April to June. The clutch of two eggs is laid directly on the ground without a nest, though larger rocks may be pushed away. It is typically in a shady spot. There is at least one observation of an adult giving a broken-wing display, apparently to distract two canyon walkers from its nest.

Vocalization

The male buff-collared nightjar's song is a "long rising, accelerating series of cuk notes ending in cuk-a-cheea that drops suddenly at the end." Both sexes make "chuck" calls; males give a "quirr" call. It typically sings the most at dawn and dusk but will continue intermittently through the night. It sings nightly between mid May and early August and infrequently during the rest of the year.

Status

The IUCN has assessed the buff-collared nightjar as being of Least Concern. It has a very large range and an estimated population of 2,000,000, though that number is believed to be decreasing. No immediate threats have been determined. There is potential for habitat loss in Mexico; virtually all of its tiny U.S. range is protected in some way from that threat.

References

External links
Buff-collared Nightjar photo; Article siti.com
RangeMaps & synopsis InfoNatura NatureServe
Buff-collared Nightjar photo gallery VIREO 

buff-collared nightjar
Native birds of the Southwestern United States
Birds of Central America
Birds of Mexico
Birds of Guatemala
Birds of Honduras
Birds of Nicaragua
Birds of the Sierra Madre Occidental
Birds of the Sierra Madre del Sur
Birds of the Trans-Mexican Volcanic Belt
buff-collared nightjar
buff-collared nightjar